Tygart Junction was an unincorporated community in Barbour County, West Virginia, USA, which was abandoned over a century ago. It was at the site of a B&O railroad junction at the confluence of the Buckhannon River with the Tygart Valley River.

References 

Unincorporated communities in Barbour County, West Virginia